Poland participated in the Eurovision Song Contest 2001 with the song "2 Long" written by Robert Chojnacki and John Porter. The song was performed by Piasek, who was selected by the Polish broadcaster Telewizja Polska (TVP) through an internal selection to represent Poland at the 2001 contest in Copenhagen, Denmark. Poland returned to the Eurovision Song Contest after an enforced one-year absence as one of the bottom seven countries in the 1999 contest. Piasek and the song "Z kimś takim" were announced as the Polish entry on 2 March 2001. The song was later translated from Polish to English for the Eurovision Song Contest and was titled "2 Long".

Poland competed in the Eurovision Song Contest which took place on 12 May 2001. Performing during the show in position 18, Poland placed twentieth out of the 23 participating countries, scoring 11 points.

Background 

Prior to the 2001 Contest, Poland had participated in the Eurovision Song Contest six times since its first entry in 1994. Poland's highest placement in the contest, to this point, has been second place, which the nation achieved with its debut entry in 1994 with the song "To nie ja!" performed by Edyta Górniak. The Polish national broadcaster, Telewizja Polska (TVP), broadcasts the event within Poland and organises the selection process for the nation's entry. Having internally selected their entries since 1994, the broadcaster opted to continue selecting the Polish entry via an internal selection for 2001.

Before Eurovision

Internal selection 

The Polish entry for the 2001 Eurovision Song Contest was selected via an internal selection by the TVP Entertainment Agency, headed by Marek Sierocki, with several songwriters being directly invited to submit songs. On 2 March 2001, it was announced that Piasek would represent Poland in the Eurovision Song Contest 2001 with the song "Z kimś takim", written by Robert Chojnacki and Piasek himself. Prior to the selection of Piasek and the song, it was revealed that TVP had initially selected a song written by Romuald Lipko and Andrzej Mogielnicki and had approached singer Natalia Kukulska and Piasek to perform the song. However, the proposal was rejected by both artists due to artistic disagreements.

On 28 March 2001, TVP announced that Piasek would perform the English language version of "Z kimś takim" at the Eurovision Song Contest. The new version, titled "2 Long" with English lyrics by John Porter, was released on 23 April 2001. "2 Long" was the first song performed entirely in the English language that was selected to represent Poland at the Eurovision Song Contest.

At Eurovision 
According to Eurovision rules, all nations with the exceptions of the bottom seven countries in the 2001 contest competed in the final on 12 May 2001. On 21 November 2000, a special allocation draw was held which determined the running order and Poland was set to perform in position 18, following the entry from Slovenia and before the entry from Germany. Poland finished in twentieth place with 11 points.

The show was broadcast in Poland on TVP1 and TVP Polonia with commentary by Artur Orzech. The Polish spokesperson, who announced the Polish votes during the final, was Maciej Orłoś.

Voting 
Below is a breakdown of points awarded to Poland and awarded by Poland in the contest. The nation awarded its 12 points to Estonia in the contest.

After Eurovision 
After the contest, Poland was awarded the Barbara Dex Award, a humorous fan award given to the worst dressed artist each year as voted by the fansite House of Eurovision, after Piasek performed in a tatty fur jacket during the first verse of the song, which was non-apparent from the lyrical content of the song.

References 

2001
Countries in the Eurovision Song Contest 2001
Eurovision
Eurovision